Alfred Edwards may refer to:
A. G. Edwards (bishop) (1848–1937), Archbishop of Wales
Alfred Edwards (football executive) (1850–1923), co-founder and first elected president of Italian football club A.C. Milan
Alfred Edwards (journalist) (1856–1914), journalist and press magnate
Alfred Edwards (politician) (1888–1958), British Member of Parliament for Middlesbrough East, 1935–1950
Alfred Edwards (economist) (1920–2007), professor of business administration